Peter Salmon may refer to:

Peter Salmon (filmmaker) (born 1976), New Zealand based film and television writer/director
Peter Salmon (judge) (born 1935), New Zealand judge who chaired the Royal Commission on Auckland Governance
Peter Salmon (producer) (born 1956), British television producer and executive
Peter Salmon (swimmer) (born 1929), Canadian swimmer
Pete Salmon (born 1992), Jamaican cricketer